Saville is a surname. Notable people with the surname include:
 Alan Saville (1946–2016), British archaeologist
 George Saville (born 1993), British football player
 Glen Saville (born 1976), former Australian basketball player
 Gordon P. Saville (1902–1984), United States Air Force Major General
 Harriet Elizabeth Savill or Saville  (1789–1857), English actress
 Ian Saville (born 1953), English magician
 Jack Saville (born 1991), British football player
 Jane Saville (born 1974), Australian racewalker
 Jenny Saville (born 1970), English artist
 John Saville (1916–2009), English Marxist historian
 John Faucit Saville or Savill, (1783?–1853), English actor and theatre manager
 Kate Saville (1835/1836–1922), English actress
 Luke Saville (born 1994), Australian tennis player
 Lynn Saville (born 1950), American photographer
 Malcolm Saville (1901–1982), English author
 Mark Saville, Baron Saville of Newdigate (born 1936), English judge, former Justice of the Supreme Court of the United Kingdom
 Marshall Howard Saville (1867–1935), American archaeologist
 Matthew Saville, Australian television and film director
 Matthew J. Saville, New Zealand actor and filmmaker, director of Juniper
 Natalie Saville (born 1978), Australian race walker
 Peter Saville (graphic designer) (born 1955), English art director and graphic designer
 Peter Saville (psychologist) (born 1946), British psychologist
 Philip Saville (1930–2016), British television and film director
 Sue Saville, English television journalist

See also
 Savile
 Savill (surname)
 Savills
 Seville (disambiguation)